The 2011 Wisconsin–Whitewate Warhawks football team was an American football team that represented the University of Wisconsin–Whitewater as a member of the Wisconsin Intercollegiate Athletic Conference (WIAC) during the 2011 NCAA Division III football season. In their fifth season under head coach Lance Leipold, the Warhawks compiled a perfect 15–0 record and won the NCAA Division III national championship.

Schedule

References

Wisconsin–Whitewater
Wisconsin–Whitewater Warhawks football seasons
NCAA Division III Football Champions
College football undefeated seasons
Wisconsin–Whitewater Warhawks football